Isidor Gansl (1896 – 1938) was a Romanian football forward of Jewish origin. He died at age 42, after struggling with a disease that left him paralyzed.

International career
Isidor Gansl played one match for Romania on 26 October 1923 under coach Constantin Rădulescu in a friendly against Turkey which ended with a 2–1 victory in which Gansl scored both of Romania's goals, becoming the first player that scored a double for Romania.

Honours

Player
Hakoah Vienna
2. Klasse: 1919–20

Manager
US Tunisienne
Tunisian league: 1929–30, 1930–31, 1932–33

References

External links
 

1896 births
1938 deaths
Romanian footballers
Romania international footballers
Sportspeople from Budapest
Association football forwards
Ferencvárosi TC footballers
Nemzeti Bajnokság I players
Jewish footballers
Romanian Jews
Jewish Romanian sportspeople
Romanian football managers
Expatriate football managers in Tunisia
Romanian expatriate sportspeople in Tunisia